Dorymyrmex breviscapis is a species of ant in the genus Dorymyrmex. Described by Forel in 1912, the species is endemic to Argentina.

References

Dorymyrmex
Hymenoptera of South America
Insects described in 1912